Aljustrel is a hamlet on the outskirts of Fátima, Portugal, in the municipality of Ourém. It was the birthplace of Lúcia dos Santos, and Francisco and Jacinta Marto, known worldwide as the "three little shepherds of Fátima" or the "three child seers", and the setting for some of the events during the apparitions of Our Lady of Fátima. There is now a small house-museum there.

See also
 Fátima, Portugal
 Our Lady of Fátima
 Chapel of the Apparitions
 Sanctuary of Fátima
 Parish Church of Fátima

References

External links

  – Official website
 Sanctuary of Fatima – Online transmissions
 Pilgrims of Fatima – Official website
 "Fatima in Sister Lucia's own words" – Free online version of the memoir book written by Sister Lucia, O.C.D.
 "The True Story of Fatima" – Free online version of the book written by Father John de Marchi, I.M.C.
 Video documentary: Portugal in 150 seconds: Fatima

Populated places in Santarém District
Ourém